is a 2006 Japanese film directed by Takashi Miike.

Plot
Katayama (Show Aikawa) is on the way home to his wife and little daughter when he stumbles on a gang of punks beating up an innocent man. Katamaya decides to help the stranger and surprisingly wins the fight. This turns out to be a bad decision as his daughter is kidnapped and murdered by the leader of the same band of young thugs. Katayama seeks revenge and tries to seek out the gang's location.

Cast
Show Aikawa
Aiko Satō
Kenichi Endō	
Sei Hiraizumi
Hiroshi Katsuno
Toru Kazama
Yutaka Matsushige
Yasukaze Motomiya
Chikage Natsuyama
Kōichirō Takami
Shin Takuma
Miho Yoshioka

Other credits
Produced by:
Yasuko Natsuyama: executive producer
Kōzō Tadokoro: producer
Casting by: Makiko Natsuyama
Art Direction by: Akira Sakamoto
Production Manager: Susumu Ejima
Special Effects supervisor: Kaori Ohtagaki

External links 
 

Films directed by Takashi Miike
2006 films
2000s thriller films
2000s vigilante films
2000s Japanese-language films
Japanese thriller films
Japanese vigilante films
Films about murder
Films set in Yokohama
2000s Japanese films